GDPS may refer to:
 Geographically Dispersed Parallel Sysplex, an extension of Parallel Sysplex of mainframes located, potentially, in different cities.
 Gyan Devi Public School Sr. Secondary, a CBSE affiliated senior secondary school in Gurgaon, Haryana, India.

See also 
 IBM Parallel Sysplex
 Gyan Devi Group of Schools